Attilio Piccioni (14 July 1892 – 10 March 1976) was an Italian politician. He had been a prominent member of the Christian Democrats.

Biography 
Piccioni was born on 14 July 1892 in Poggio Bustone (Province of Rieti, Umbria) and graduated in Law at the Sapienza University of Rome. He participated in the First World War, first as an officer of the Bersaglieri, then as a vehicle instructor.

After the War Piccioni moved to Turin, where he married, and joined the Italian People's Party (PPI). He became secretary of the Turin section of PPI and member of its National Council.

With the advent of fascism in power, in 1926, after the forced dissolution of the PPI, he moved to Pistoia, where he resumed practicing as a lawyer and became a widower. In 1943 he was a member of the National Liberation Committee of Tuscany.

After the end of the Second World War he moved to Rome and on 2 June 1946 he was elected to the Constituent Assembly among the ranks of the Christian Democrats (DC). He was part of the "Commission of 75" in charge of drawing up and proposing the draft Constitution of the Italian Republic.

A trusted man of Alcide De Gasperi, Piccioni was the political secretary of DC from 1946 to 1949 and Deputy Prime Minister in the fifth, seventh and eighth De Gasperi government. He also served as Minister of Grace and Justice in the sixth De Gasperi government.

After the rejection of the trust by the Chamber of Deputies to the eighth De Gasperi government (28 July 1953), Piccioni was commissioned by the President of the Republic Luigi Einaudi to form the new government. However he had to give up the office, since he failed to form a majority in the Parliament.

Subsequently Piccioni was appointed Minister of Foreign Affairs in the brief first Fanfani government (January–February 1954), after which he was summoned again by President Einaudi to succeed Fanfani as Prime Minister. Piccioni, however, did not want to take on this responsibility for the involvement of his son Piero, composer, in the case of Wilma Montesi, a Roman girl found dead on the beach of Torvaianica; thus he was confirmed as Minister of Foreign Affairs in the new Scelba Government. On 26 March 1954, the Montesi case (initially filed) was officially reopened by the Rome Court of Appeal. Because of this scandal, on 19 September Piccioni resigned as Minister of Foreign Affairs and from all his official offices. Two days later, his son Piero was arrested on charges of manslaughter and drug use and then imprisoned in the Regina Coeli prison. Piero obtained provisional freedom after three months in preventive detention and was finally cleared of all charges.

In the years 1956-57, Piccioni was the head of the Italian delegation to the United Nations.

He served again as Deputy Prime Minister in the third (1960-1962) and fourth Fanfani government (1962-1963), in which he also assumed the office of Minister of Foreign Affairs, to replace Antonio Segni, who became President of the Republic. He was again Deputy Prime Minister and Minister of Foreign Affairs in the first Leone government (1963) and Minister without portfolio in the I, II, and III Moro government (1963-1968).

He died in Rome in 1976.

References

External links 
Farnesina website

1892 births
1976 deaths
People from the Province of Rieti
Deputy Prime Ministers of Italy
Foreign ministers of Italy
Christian Democracy (Italy) politicians
20th-century Italian politicians
Members of the Constituent Assembly of Italy
Members of the Senate of the Republic (Italy)
Members of the Chamber of Deputies (Italy)
Italian Ministers of Justice
Sapienza University of Rome alumni